Capanne is a village in Tuscany, central Italy, administratively a frazione of the comune of Montopoli in Val d'Arno, province of Pisa. At the time of the 2006 parish census its population was 2,635.

Capanne is about 36 km from Pisa and 3 km from Montopoli in Val d'Arno.

References 

Frazioni of the Province of Pisa